Buivydiškės is a village in Vilnius district municipality, Lithuania. According to the 2011 census, it had 1,314 residents. Buivydiškės Manor was first mentioned in 1593. The village has a technical school for agronomy and zootechnics, established in 1961. The school helped the village to grow from 190 residents in 1959 to 1,265 in 1970. Buivydiškės became a suburb of expanding Vilnius, capital of Lithuania. In 1996, part of the settlement was transferred to Vilnius city municipality.

History 
Buivydiškės village was first mentioned in XIII century, in 1593 the Buivydiškės manor is being mentioned.

References 

Villages in Vilnius County
Vilnius District Municipality